CJWE-FM (88.1 FM) is a radio station in Calgary, Alberta. Owned by the Aboriginal Multi-Media Society, it broadcasts programming targeting southern Alberta's First Nations communities, including mainstream country music, and specialty shows featuring indigenous music or presented in native languages such as Stoney. It is similar in format to its sister radio network CFWE, which focuses primarily on northern Alberta's First Nations communities.

History 
Following the collapse of the Aboriginal Voices Radio Network (which broadcast on 88.1 MHz in Calgary as CKAV-FM-3), the CRTC pursued new applicants for indigenous radio stations to fill its frequencies. The Aboriginal Multi-Media Society (owner of the indigenous network CFWE) was granted stations in Calgary and Edmonton.

The Calgary station, named CJWE-FM, began testing its signal in April 2018, and officially launched in June. The station features similar programming to its Edmonton-based counterpart CFWE, including a mix of mainstream country music, and specialty programs targeting Southern Alberta's indigenous communities in the Blackfoot, Cree, Nakoda, and T'suutina languages.

In December 2018, the CRTC granted approval for the AMMSA to convert the CFWE rebroadcaster CFWE-FM-2 (Piikani 147) to a rebroadcaster of CJWE, as it would broadcast content of greater relevance to the region.

In May 2022, the CRTC granted approval for the AMMSA to add a new, 100,000-watt rebroadcaster in Lethbridge on 103.5 FM.

References

External links
 
 CJWE-FM history - Canadian Communications Foundation
 

JWE
JWE
Radio stations established in 2018
2018 establishments in Alberta